František Kučera (born February 3, 1968) is a Czech former professional ice hockey defenceman who played in the National Hockey League (NHL) for the Chicago Blackhawks, Hartford Whalers, Vancouver Canucks, Philadelphia Flyers, Columbus Blue Jackets, Pittsburgh Penguins and Washington Capitals.

Playing career
Originally drafted in 1986 by the Chicago Blackhawks, Kučera played parts of four seasons with Chicago before he was traded to the Hartford Whalers. He would also play for the Vancouver Canucks and Philadelphia Flyers before he returned to play hockey in the Czech Republic at the end of the 1996–97 NHL season.

Three years later, when the NHL expanded again, Kučera returned to North America and signed with the Columbus Blue Jackets.  Midway through the season, he was traded to the Pittsburgh Penguins.  He was traded again, this time to the Washington Capitals in the deal that also sent Jaromír Jágr to Washington. After playing a season, he once again returned to the Czech Republic to play hockey.

Kučera played 465 NHL games, scoring 24 goals and 95 assists. In 1998, he was a member of the Czech Olympic Team and won the golden Olympic medal.

Career statistics

Regular season and playoffs

International

External links
 

1968 births
Chicago Blackhawks draft picks
Chicago Blackhawks players
Columbus Blue Jackets players
Czech ice hockey defencemen
Czechoslovak ice hockey defencemen
Hartford Whalers players
HC Dukla Jihlava players
HC Slavia Praha players
HC Sparta Praha players
Houston Aeros (1994–2013) players
Ice hockey players at the 1998 Winter Olympics
Indianapolis Ice players
Living people
Medalists at the 1998 Winter Olympics
Olympic gold medalists for the Czech Republic
Olympic ice hockey players of the Czech Republic
Olympic medalists in ice hockey
Ice hockey people from Prague
Philadelphia Flyers players
Philadelphia Phantoms players
Pittsburgh Penguins players
Syracuse Crunch players
Vancouver Canucks players
Washington Capitals players
Czechoslovak expatriate sportspeople in the United States
Czechoslovak expatriate ice hockey people
Czech expatriate ice hockey players in the United States
Czech expatriate ice hockey players in Canada